Organization of Iranian People's Fedai Guerrillas–Majority Left Wing (PIPFG–MLW) was a small pro-minority circle within the majority faction of the Iranian communist party Fedai Guerrillas. It was formed in April 1980, but decided to remain in the majority faction and published its position in the internal bulletin Be Pish. Following expel of its leader from the central committee, it broke away from the majority faction in October 1980.

See also

References

1980 establishments in Iran
1982 disestablishments in Iran
Defunct communist parties in Iran
Political parties disestablished in 1982
Political parties established in 1980